The rackelhahn or rackelwild is a hybrid between the western capercaillie and the black grouse. It is likely unable to produce offspring in the wild.

Tetraonini
Birds of Europe
Grouse
Bird hybrids
Intergeneric hybrids